Lega Marche, whose complete name is , is a regionalist political party active in Marche. The party was a "national" section of Lega Nord (LN) from 1991 to 2000 and has been the regional section of Lega per Salvini Premier (LSP) in Marche since 2020.

The party has long been led by Luca Rodolfo Paolini, who has served in the Chamber of Deputies from 2008 to 2013 and again since 2018. The current leader is pro-tempore commissioner Riccardo Marchetti, from Umbria (Lega Umbria).

Recent history
In 2010 the party entered the Legislative Assembly of Marche for the first time with two regional councillors, while in 2015 it obtained its best result ever (13.0%) and, despite a reduction of the Assembly's numbers, obtained one more councillor.

Popular support
The party is a tiny one among the national sections of the LN, but it is recently gaining clout. In the 2015 regional election it won 13.0% of the vote in the region, its best result ever. While being usually stronger in the province of Pesaro and Urbino, the northern province which has historically been part of Romagna, in 2015 it obtained its best score in Macerata (17.2%).

The electoral results of Lega Nord Marche in the region are shown in the table below.

Electoral results

Legislative Assembly of Marche

Leadership 
Secretary: Luca Rodolfo Paolini (1995–2017), Paolo Arrigoni (commissioner, 2017–2020), Riccardo Marchetti (commissioner, 2020–present)
President: unknown (1995–2002), Stefano Gaetani (2002–2007), Giordano Giampaoli (2012–2017)

External links
Official website

References

Federalist parties in Italy
Lega Nord
Political parties in Marche